The Spartan South Midlands Football League is an English football league covering Hertfordshire, northwest Greater London, central Buckinghamshire and southern Bedfordshire. It is a feeder to the Southern Football League or the Isthmian League, and consists of five divisions – three for first teams (Premier Division, Division One and Division Two), and two for reserve teams (Reserve Division One and Reserve Division Two).

The Premier Division is at step 5 (or level 9) and Division One at step 6 (level 10) of the National League System (NLS) respectively. Division Two, at level 11, and the reserve divisions are not part of the NLS.

History
The league was formed in 1997 by the merger of the Spartan League and the South Midlands League. It is also known as the Molten Spartan South Midlands Football League after its sponsors.

Current members

Premier Division
(step 5)

Ardley United
Arlesey Town
Aylesbury Vale Dynamos
Baldock Town
Biggleswade United
Cockfosters
Colney Heath
Crawley Green
Dunstable Town
Harpenden Town
Hoddesdon Town
Leighton Town
Leverstock Green
London Colney
Potton United
Risborough Rangers
Shefford Town & Campton
Stotfold
St Panteleimon
Tring Athletic

Division One
(step 6)

Amersham Town
Ampthill Town
Bedford
Buckingham Athletic
Burton Park Wanderers
Eaton Socon
Holmer Green
Langford
Letchworth Garden City Eagles
London Tigers
Lutterworth Athletic
Moulton
Northampton ON Chenecks
Northampton Sileby Rangers
Raunds Town
Rugby Borough
Rushden & Higham United
Thame Rangers
Wellingborough Whitworth
Winslow United

Division Two
(NLS feeder, formerly step 7)

Aston Clinton
Berkhamsted Raiders
Bovingdon
Buckingham United
Caddington
Codicote
Eynesbury United
Leighton Town Development
MK College Academy
New Bradwell St Peter
Old Bradwell United
Pitstone & Ivinghoe
Potton United Reserves
Risborough Rangers Development
Sarratt
The 61
Totternhoe
Tring Corinthians

Divisional champions

1997–98
For the league's first "transitional" season, the members of the amalgamating leagues were split into three tiers, "Premier", "Senior" and "Division One". The top and bottom tier were split geographically into North and South Sections.

1998–2001
In 1998, the geographic sections were abolished, and a simple three-tier structure with promotion and relegation between the divisions was introduced.

2001–date
In 2001, the Senior Division and Division One were renamed Divisions One and Two respectively.

External links
 SSMFL at Full Time
 SSMFL at Non-League Matters

 
1997 establishments in England
9
Sports leagues established in 1997